The Ministry of East African Cooperation (MEAC) was a government ministry responsible for coordinating Tanzania's political, economic, military, social, and cultural relations with the other countries of the East African Community.

The ministry was created in 2006 by Government Notice No. 1. Its offices are located in Dar es Salaam. The Minister for East African Cooperation is Samuel Sitta.

The Ministry was merged into the Ministry of Foreign Affairs and East African Cooperation under John Magufuli's cabinet.

See also
Minister of East African Cooperation

References

External links

East African Cooperation
East African Community
Tanzania, East African Cooperation
2006 establishments in Tanzania